Djerassi Glacier is a 2.8 km long and 1 km wide steep valley glacier situated south of Gorichane Glacier, west of the head of Malpighi Glacier, northwest of the head of Mackenzie Glacier, and north-northeast of Pirogov Glacier on Brabant Island in the Palmer Archipelago, Antarctica.  It drains the west slopes of Harvey Heights and the north slopes of Mount Parry, and flows northwestwards into Lanusse Bay north of Venchan Bluff.

The glacier is named for the Bulgarian-American scientist Carl Djerassi (1923-2015), a co-inventor of the oral contraceptive pill.

Location
British mapping in 1980.

See also
 List of glaciers in the Antarctic
 Glaciology

Maps
 Antarctic Digital Database (ADD). Scale 1:250000 topographic map of Antarctica. Scientific Committee on Antarctic Research (SCAR). Since 1993, regularly upgraded and updated.
British Antarctic Territory. Scale 1:200000 topographic map. DOS 610 Series, Sheet W 64 62. Directorate of Overseas Surveys, Tolworth, UK, 1980.
Brabant Island to Argentine Islands. Scale 1:250000 topographic map. British Antarctic Survey, 2008.

References
 Djerassi Glacier. SCAR Composite Gazetteer of Antarctica.
 Bulgarian Antarctic Gazetteer. Antarctic Place-names Commission. (details in Bulgarian, basic data in English)

External links
 Djerassi Glacier. Copernix satellite image

Glaciers of the Palmer Archipelago
Bulgaria and the Antarctic
Brabant Island